Ilya Igorevich Telegin (born 22 January 1981) is a former Uzbekistani professional football player. He also holds Russian citizenship.

Club career
He made his Russian Football National League debut for FC Khimki on 10 April 2003 in a game against FC Neftekhimik Nizhnekamsk. He played 5 seasons in the FNL for Khimki, FC Anzhi Makhachkala and FC Metallurg Lipetsk.

External links
 
 

1981 births
Living people
Uzbekistani footballers
Russian footballers
Association football forwards
Association football midfielders
Navbahor Namangan players
Uzbekistan Super League players
FC Khimki players
FC Anzhi Makhachkala players
FC Metallurg Lipetsk players
FC Tekstilshchik Ivanovo players